Matthew Linn Bruce (October 1, 1860 – February 26, 1936) was an American lawyer and politician from New York.

Early life and education
Matthew Linn Bruce was born October 1, 1860 in Mercersburg, Pennsylvania. He was the son of Dr. James Bruce and Mary (Linn) Bruce (ca. 1830–1907). He was educated at Andes Academy, and graduated A.B. from Rutgers College as valedictorian of the class of 1884. Then he studied law in the office of Cassius M. Shaw at Andes, N.Y., and was admitted to the bar in 1889.

Career
In 1890 moved to New York City where he resided in the Twenty-first Assembly District. He was managing clerk in the office of Hector M. Hitchings until 1892, and then opened his own law office. In 1894, he married Lillian (Ballantine) Knapp, and they had four children.

In 1903, he was president of the New York County Republican Committee, and conducted the unsuccessful campaign of Mayor Seth Low for re-election.

He was the lieutenant governor of New York from 1905 to 1906, elected in 1904, but defeated for re-election in November 1906 although his running mate Charles Evans Hughes was elected governor. All other Republican candidates were defeated by the nominees of the Democratic/Independence League fusion ticket. On December 5, 1906, he resigned and was appointed by Governor Frank W. Higgins a justice of the New York Supreme Court to fill the vacancy caused by the resignation of Justice Morgan J. O'Brien, and remained on the bench until the end of 1907. In 1908, he resumed the practice of law, but on October 13 of the same year he was reappointed to the Supreme Court by Gov. Hughes to fill the vacancy caused by the resignation of Justice David Leventritt, and remained on the bench until the end of the year. In November 1908, he ran for the Supreme Court on the Republican ticket to succeed himself, but was defeated by the Democratic candidate Irving Lehman.

Sources
  The Rep. nominees, in NYT on September 16, 1904
  Bruce resigned and appointed justice, in NYT on December 6, 1906
  Political Graveyard
  His mother's obit, transcribed from Brooklyn Standard Union of at RootsWeb
  Bios of Men of 1914, transcribed from Builders of Our Nation (American Publishers' Association, 1915)

External links
  Picture postcard of his residence at Andes, N.Y.

1860 births
1936 deaths
Lieutenant Governors of New York (state)
New York Supreme Court Justices
Lawyers from New York City
People from Andes, New York
Rutgers University alumni
People from Mercersburg, Pennsylvania
New York (state) Republicans
Politicians from New York City